Small Revelations is an album by the American singer/songwriter Chris Smither, released in 1997. Emmylou Harris recorded “Slow Surprise” for the Horse Whisperer soundtrack CD.

Reception

Music critic Robert Christgau gave the album a three-star honorable mention, commenting: "blues his religion, his therapy, his metier."

Track listing
All songs by Chris Smither unless otherwise noted.
 "Thanks to You" (Jesse Winchester) – 2:43
 "Slow Surprise" – 2:46
 "Hold On" – 4:02
 "Caveman" – 4:36
 "Help Me Now" – 3:23
 "Small Revelations" – 4:00
 "Winsome Smile" – 3:44
 "Dust My Broom"– 3:09
 "Sportin' Life" (R. Johnson) – 3:07
 "Hook, Line and Sinker" – 4:00

Personnel
Chris Smither – vocals, guitar

References

Chris Smither albums
1997 albums